Schizosaccharomycetales is an order in the kingdom of fungi that contains the family Schizosaccharomycetaceae.

References

Yeasts
Ascomycota
Ascomycota orders